Esperándote may refer to:
 Esperándote (TV series), a 1985 Mexican telenovela
 Esperándote (Tito Rojas song), 1995
 Esperándote (Manuel Turizo song), 2017